Coastal Studios, formerly known as Coastal Carolina Sound Studios, is a recording studio located in Wilmington, North Carolina. The company has worked on many anime, live action films and television shows. The company is best known for its work on anime projects such as Blue Submarine No. 6 and Oh! My Goddess. The company previously provided ADR work for Hollywood films and television in the 1990s such as Batman & Robin, The Lion King, and Dawson's Creek.

History 
Coastal Carolina Sound Studios was founded in 1993 by Scott Houle. The company started doing ADR for feature films. The company then later began dubbing anime in 1995 after Scott was introduced to Robert Woodhead of AnimEigo. Coastal went on to dub Lupin III: The Fuma Conspiracy for their first anime project for Animeigo. Coastal continued to dub anime for AnimEigo and later other anime companies such as ADV Films, Bandai Visual, and Media Blasters. Coastal also worked on ADR in feature films and television programs. Coastal went on to dub the You're Under Arrest TV episodes, specials and movie from 2002 to 2003. Coastal Carolina Studios changed its name to Coastal Studios in 2007. Coastal Studios went on the dub Shogun Assassin 3: Slashing Blades of Carnage, Shogun Assassin 4: Five Fistfuls Of Gold, Shogun Assassin 5, and Clamp School Detectives.

Credits 
Coastal Studio's production credits include:

References

External links 
 
 
Crystal Acids Page

Anime companies
Companies based in North Carolina
Dubbing studios
Mass media companies established in 1993
1993 establishments in North Carolina
Mass media companies of the United States
Video production companies